Sainte-Catherine (French) or Sint-Katelijne (Dutch) is a Brussels Metro station. It is located at the /, between the / and the /, in the municipality of the City of Brussels, Belgium. It is also situated near Saint Catherine's Church, which gives the station its name.

The station was inaugurated on 13 April 1977, when Brussels' first metro line (line 1) was converted from premetro (underground tram) to heavy metro. Following the reorganisation of the Brussels Metro on 4 April 2009, it is served by lines 1 and 5, which use the same tracks at this point.

History
The station was opened on 13 April 1977, a short extension of line 1 from the neighbouring De Brouckère station. Until 8 May 1981 (with the opening of the extension to Beekkant), the station was the western terminus of the metro.

The station is unique in Brussels for being located in the reclaimed and covered space of an old harbor dock, part of the original the Port of Brussels. Because of this, the metro tunnel runs very shallowly at this point, making the station one of the few in Brussels that lack an underground mezzanine. Entrances and exits from the station lead up into the middle of the Place Sainte-Catherine.

In late 2006 and in 2007, the station underwent a thorough renovation, giving it a more modern look both under and above ground.

References

External links
 

Brussels metro stations
Railway stations opened in 1969
City of Brussels